Chrysothamnus stylosus, called pillar false gumweed, or resinbush, is a species of flowering plants in the tribe Astereae within the family Asteraceae. It is native to Arizona and Utah in the southwestern United States.

Chrysothamnus stylosus is a shrub up to 120 cm (48 inches) tall with bark that tends to turn gray and flaky when it gets old. Flower heads are yellow, usually produced in dense arrays of many heads. The species grows on sandy soil in canyonlands and open woodlands.

References

Astereae
Flora of Arizona
Flora of Utah
Flora of the Colorado Plateau and Canyonlands region
Endemic flora of the United States
Plants described in 1896
Taxa named by Alice Eastwood
Flora without expected TNC conservation status